Hyperochtha is a genus of moth in the family Lecithoceridae.

Species
 Hyperochtha acanthovalva Park, 2001
 Hyperochtha butyropa (Meyrick, 1910)
 Hyperochtha dischema (Meyrick, 1916)
 Hyperochtha hoplophora Gozmány, 1973
 Hyperochtha justa (Meyrick, 1910)
 Hyperochtha tanyglocha Wu & Park, 1999

References

Natural History Museum Lepidoptera genus database

 
Torodorinae
Moth genera
Taxa named by Edward Meyrick